Feudal can refer to:

Feudalism
Feudal, Saskatchewan, a village in Saskatchewan, Canada
Feudal (game), boardgame by Avalon Hill/Hasbro
Corporation (feudal Europe)
Feudal baron and prescriptive barony
Demesne (feudal domain)
Feudal Japan
Feudal land tenure